Apsheronsk is a town and the administrative center of Apsheronsky District of Krasnodar Krai, Russia, located on the Pshekha River (in the Kuban's basin). Population: 39,488 (2020), [   33,400 (1968).

It was previously known as Apsheronskaya.

Etymology
The name "Absheron" comes from Persian āb šurān (salty waters). This also gave its name to the Absheron peninsula in Azerbaijan, where the capital Baku is located.

History
It was founded in 1863 as the stanitsa of Apsheronskaya.

Geography

Climate
Under the Köppen climate classification Apsheronsk has a humid subtropical climate (Cfa).

There is significant rainfall throughout the year in Apsheronsk. The average annual temperature in Apsheronsk is 12.0 °C. The warmest month of the year is July with an average temperature of 22.5 °C. In January, the average temperature is 1.8 °C. It is the lowest average temperature of the whole year.

The driest month is February with 62 mm. Most precipitation falls in November and December, with an average of 94 mm. About 941 mm of precipitation falls annually.

Administrative and municipal status
Within the framework of administrative divisions, Apsheronsk serves as the administrative center of Apsheronsky District. As an administrative division, it is, together with three rural localities, incorporated within Apsheronsky District as the Town of Apsheronsk. As a municipal division, the Town of Apsheronsk is incorporated within Apsheronsky Municipal District as Apsheronskoye Urban Settlement.

Economy
The town's main industries are forestry and woodworking.

Transportation
The Apsheronsk narrow-gauge railway is the longest railway of its type in Russia.

References

Notes

Sources

External links
Official website of Apsheronsk 
Directory of organizations in Apsheronsk 

Cities and towns in Krasnodar Krai
Apsheronsky District
1863 establishments in the Russian Empire